Langdon is a city in Reno County, Kansas, United States.  As of the 2020 census, the population of the city was 39.

History

The first post office in Langdon was established in 1873. Langdon was named for a local businessman.

In 1887, the Chicago, Kansas and Nebraska Railway built a main line from Herington through Langdon to Pratt.  In 1888, this line was extended to Liberal.  Later, it was extended to Tucumcari, New Mexico and El Paso, Texas.  It foreclosed in 1891 and taken over by Chicago, Rock Island and Pacific Railway, which shut down in 1980 and reorganized as Oklahoma, Kansas and Texas Railroad, merged in 1988 with Missouri Pacific Railroad, merged in 1997 with Union Pacific Railroad.  Most locals still refer to this railroad as the "Rock Island".

Geography
Langdon is located at  (37.853349, -98.324495).

Demographics

2010 census
As of the census of 2010, there were 42 people, 20 households, and 11 families residing in the city. The racial makeup of the city was 95.2% White and 4.8% Native American.

There were 20 households, of which 20.0% had children under the age of 18 living with them, 45.0% were married couples living together, 5.0% had a female householder with no husband present, 5.0% had a male householder with no wife present, and 45.0% were non-families. 40.0% of all households were made up of individuals, and 25% had someone living alone who was 65 years of age or older. The average household size was 2.10 and the average family size was 2.91.

The median age in the city was 50.3 years. 14.3% of residents were under the age of 18; 9.6% were between the ages of 18 and 24; 12% were from 25 to 44; 42.8% were from 45 to 64; and 21.4% were 65 years of age or older. The gender makeup of the city was 52.4% male and 47.6% female.

2000 census
As of the census of 2000, there were 72 people, 30 households, and 18 families residing in the city. The racial makeup of the city was 93.06% White, 1.39% Native American, 1.39% from other races, and 4.17% from two or more races. Hispanic or Latino people of any race were 1.39% of the population.

There were 30 households, out of which 23.3% had children under the age of 18 living with them, 46.7% were married couples living together, 10.0% had a female householder with no husband present, and 40.0% were non-families. 40.0% of all households were made up of individuals, and 10.0% had someone living alone who was 65 years of age or older. The average household size was 2.40 and the average family size was 3.22.

In the city, the population was spread out, with 27.8% under the age of 18, 9.7% from 18 to 24, 15.3% from 25 to 44, 33.3% from 45 to 64, and 13.9% who were 65 years of age or older. The median age was 42 years. For every 100 females, there were 94.6 males. For every 100 females age 18 and over, there were 85.7 males.

The median income for a household in the city was $36,250, and the median income for a family was $45,833. Males had a median income of $33,750 versus $14,375 for females. The per capita income for the city was $17,136. There were 22.2% of families and 24.2% of the population living below the poverty line, including 44.4% of under eighteens and none of those over 64.

Education
The community is served by Fairfield USD 310 public school district, which is located about 1 mile north of the city.  Before the creation of USD 310, the old Langdon High School mascot was the Owls.

References

Further reading

External links

 Langdon - Directory of Public Officials
 Langdon city map, KDOT

Cities in Kansas
Cities in Reno County, Kansas
1873 establishments in Kansas
Populated places established in 1873